This is a list of lighthouses in Mexico. They are located along the Pacific, Gulf of Mexico, and Caribbean coastlines of the country. These are named landfall lights, or those with a range of over fifteen nautical miles.

Lighthouses

See also
Lists of lighthouses and lightvessels

References

External links

 

Mexico
Lighthouse
Lighthouses